The 7.5 cm KwK 42 L/70 (from 7.5 cm Kampfwagenkanone 42 L/70) was a 7.5 cm calibre German tank gun used on German armoured fighting vehicles in the Second World War. The gun was the armament of the Panther medium tank and two variants of the Jagdpanzer IV self-propelled anti-tank gun. On the latter it was designated as the "7.5 cm Panzerabwehrkanone 42" (7.5 cm Pak 42) anti-tank gun.

Design
The increased muzzle velocity and operating pressure of the new gun required a new armour-piercing projectile to be designed. The PzGr. 39/42 was the result, and apart from the addition of wider driving bands it was otherwise identical to the older 7.5 cm PzGr. 39. The wider driving bands added a little extra weight, from 6.8 kg for the old PzGr.39, to 7.2 kg for the new PzGr.39/42.

The gun was fired electrically, the primer being initiated using an electric current rather than a firing pin. The breech operated semi-automatically so that after the gun had fired, the empty shell casing was automatically ejected, and the falling wedge type breech block remained down so that the next round could be loaded. Once the round was loaded the breech closed automatically and the weapon was ready to be fired again. Three different types of ammunition were used: APCBC-HE, APCR and HE.

Data for KwK 42 and Pak 42

Type: Tank gun (KwK 42), Anti-tank gun (Pak 42)
Caliber: 
Shell: 75×640 mm R
Barrel length in calibres: 70
Barrel length: 
Breech: semiautomatic, falling wedge
Weight with muzzle brake and breech: 
Recoil length: 400 mm (normal), 430 mm (maximum)
Maximum range:   indirect
Sight: TZF 12 or 12a (Panther), Sfl.ZF 1a (Jagdpanzer IV/70 (A) and (V))

Ammunition
Panzergranate 39/42 (Pzgr. 39/42)
Type: Armour Piercing Capped Ballistic Cap, High Explosive
Projectile weight: 
Explosive filler: 18 g of phlegmatized RDX
Round weight: 
Round length: 
Cartridge case length: 
Muzzle velocity: 

Panzergranate 40 (Hk) (Pzgr. 40/42)
Type: Armour Piercing, Composite Rigid
Projectile weight: 
Round weight: 
Round length: 
Cartridge case length: 
Muzzle velocity: 

Sprenggranate 42 (Sprgr. 42)
Type: High explosive
Projectile weight: 
Explosive weight: 0.650 kg (1.66 lb) (2,720 Kilojoules)
Round weight: 
Round length: 
Cartridge case length: 
Muzzle velocity:

Penetration comparison

See also

Weapons of comparable role, performance and era
 British Ordnance QF 17 pounder
 US 76 mm gun M1
 USSR D-10 tank gun
Japan  Type 5 75 mm tank gun

Notes

References 

 Gander, Terry and Chamberlain, Peter. Weapons of the Third Reich: An Encyclopedic Survey of All Small Arms, Artillery and Special Weapons of the German Land Forces 1939-1945. New York: Doubleday, 1979 
 Hogg, Ian V. German Artillery of World War Two. 2nd corrected edition. Mechanicsville, PA: Stackpole Books, 1997 
 Penetration data extracted from a French DoD publication "Le Panther" Ministere de la Guerre, Section Technique de l'Armee, Groupement Auto-Chars, 1947.

External links

Tank guns of Germany
World War II artillery of Germany
World War II tank guns
Rheinmetall
75 mm artillery
Tank guns
Weapons and ammunition introduced in 1942